Whittni C. Wright (born May 14, 1987) is an American former child actress.

Wright made her movie debut in 1994's I'll Do Anything as the bratty daughter of actor Nick Nolte.  She was nominated for the Best Performance by an Actress Under Ten in a Motion Picture at the 16th Youth In Film Awards. In 1995, Wright played the daughter of Jean-Claude Van Damme's character in the movie Sudden Death.

Appearances

References

External links
 
 Whittni Wright at Turner Classic Movies

Actresses from Georgia (U.S. state)
American child actresses
American film actresses
Living people
Actresses from Augusta, Georgia
21st-century American women
1987 births